"Wild Child" is a single by Irish singer-songwriter Enya. It was released on 4 December 2001 as the second and final single from her fifth studio album, A Day Without Rain (2000).

Release
In Germany, Japan, and Korea, the single was published only on Compact Disc; in the United Kingdom, it was also published on cassette. The B-side "Midnight Blue" was later reworked and included as the title track on Enya's 2008 studio album, And Winter Came ….

Live performances
Enya performed the song at the 2001 Japan Gold Disc Award, after receiving an award for Best International Pop Albums of the Year for A Day Without Rain.

Covers and remixes
Eurodance music duo CJ Crew recorded an uptempo dance mix of the song, which appeared on the compilation album Dancemania Speed 10 (2002).

Track listing

 Promo CD 1
 "Wild Child" – 3:47

 Promo CD 2
 "Wild Child"  – 3:30

 JPN Promo CD-R
 "Wild Child" – 3:47
 "Flora's Secret" – 4:07

 Cassette
 "Wild Child"  – 3:33
 "Isobella" – 4:27

 Maxi single / Digital Download
 "Wild Child"  – 3:33
 "Midnight Blue" – 2:04
 "Song of the Sandman (Lullaby)" – 3:40

Charts

Notes

External links

2001 singles
Enya songs
2000 songs
Warner Music Group singles
Songs with music by Enya
Songs with lyrics by Roma Ryan
Pop ballads